Eton blue, or 'Shelduck Blue' is a shade of green used since early 19th century by sportsmen of Eton College. It is also used by Geelong Grammar School and is similar to the colour used by the University of Cambridge (Cambridge blue).

Chelsea FC wore Eton Blue from its founding in 1905 as the Earl of Cadogan, who was the club's president and held the title Viscount Chelsea, was an old Etonian. They changed to their darker shade of Royal Blue in 1907

See also
List of colours

References

Shades of blue
Shades of green
Eton College
School colors